Witthaya Nabthong is a Thai football defender who played for Thai internationals in the 2000 AFC Asian Cup.

External links

11v11 Profile

Witthaya Nabthong
Witthaya Nabthong
Association football defenders
Witthaya Nabthong
Witthaya Nabthong
Living people
Place of birth missing (living people)
Year of birth missing (living people)